The following is a timeline of the history of the city of Brindisi in the Apulia region of Italy.

Prior to 15th century

 266 BCE – Romans in power.
 244 BCE – Brundisium becomes a Roman colony.
 190 BCE – Appian Way (Rome-Brundisium) built (approximate date).
 49 BCE – "Caesar attempted to bottle up his rival Pompey" in Brundisium.
 38 BCE – "Foedus brundissinum, a brief reconciliation between Mark Antony and Octavian" takes place in Brundisium.
 19 BCE – 21 September: Poet Virgil dies in Brundisium.
 109 CE – Via Traiana (Beneventum-Brundisium road) built.
 5th–6th C. CE – Roman Catholic diocese of Brindisi established.
 7th C. CE – Lombards in power.
 836 – Brindisi sacked by Saracens.
 867 – Brindisi taken by forces of Louis II of Italy.
 1071 – Normans in power.
 1080 –  (church) built.
 1089 –  dedicated.
 1192 –  (fountain) installed.
 1225 – Wedding of Frederick II, Holy Roman Emperor and Isabella II of Jerusalem.
 1227 –  (castle) built.
 1230 –  (church) built.
 1310 –  (church) built.
 1322 –  (church) built.
 1348 – Plague.
 1352 – Brindisi sacked by forces of Louis I of Hungary.
 1383 – Brindisi sacked by forces of Louis I, Duke of Anjou.
 1385 – Raimondo Del Balzo Orsini in power.

15th–19th centuries
 1456 – 1456 Central Italy earthquakes.
 1496 – Venetians in power.
 1509 – Venetian rule ends.
 1528 – One of Brindisi's  collapses.
 1734 - Francisco José de Ovando, 1st Marquis of Brindisi captures the castle of Brindisi.
 1743 – 1743 Salento earthquake.
 1860
 Brindisi becomes part of the Kingdom of Italy.
  (provincial district) established.
 1861 – Population: 9,137.(it)
 1865 – Brindisi railway station opens.
 1866 – Adriatic railway (Lecce-Brindisi) begins operating.
 1870
 Peninsular & Oriental Steam Navigation Company adds Brindisi to its route.
 Brindisi Marittima railway station opened (closed in 2006).
 1871 – Population: 13,755.
 1881 – Population: 16,618.(it)
 1886 – Taranto–Brindisi railway begins operating.
 1892 – Indipendente newspaper begins publication.
 1898 – Peninsular & Oriental Steam Navigation Company deletes Brindisi from its route.

20th century

 1901 – Population: 25,317.
 1905 – Harbour railway station built.
 1911 – Population: 25,692.(it)
 1912 – F.B. Brindisi 1912 (football club) formed.
 1916 –  (seaplane base) built in the Port of Brindisi.
 1923 – Brindisi – Salento Airport built.
 1927 – Administrative Province of Brindisi formed.
 1931 –  (war monument) erected.
 1933 –  erected.
 1934 - Brindisi Airport commercial flights start.
 1936 – Population: 41,699.(it)
 1943 – September: Italian prime minister Badoglio and king Victor Emmanuel flee to Brindisi from Rome after the Armistice of Cassibile during World War II.
 1944 – February: Administrative seat of national government relocated from Brindisi to Salerno.
 1961 – Population: 70,657.(it)
 1963 – Archivio di Stato di Brindisi (state archives) established.
 1969 –  (transit entity) formed.
 1979 –  newspaper begins publication.
 1991 – Population: 95,383.(it)

21st century

 2006 – Teatro Verdi (Brindisi) (theatre) opens.
 2012 – 19 May: Brindisi school bombing.
 2013 – Population: 88,611.
 2016 – June: Local election held; Angela Carluccio becomes mayor.
 2018 – June: Local election held; Riccardo Rossi becomes mayor.

See also
 
 
 List of mayors of Brindisi
 List of bishops of Brindisi
  region

Other cities in the macroregion of South Italy:(it)
 Timeline of Bari, Apulia region
 Timeline of L'Aquila, Abruzzo region
 Timeline of Naples, Campania region
 Timeline of Reggio Calabria
 Timeline of Salerno, Campania
 Timeline of Taranto, Apulia

References

This article incorporates information from the Italian Wikipedia.

Bibliography

in English

in Italian

 A. Della Monaca. Memoria historica dell’antichissima e fedelissima città di Brindisi (Lecce 1674)
 A. De Leo. Dell’antichissima città di Brindisi e suo celebre porto (Naples, 1846)
 
 F. Ascoli. La storia di Brindisi (Rimini 1886)
 
  circa 1900?
 
 
 R. Alaggio. Brindisi medievale. Natura, Santi e Sovrani in una città di frontiera (Naples, 2009)

External links

 Items related to Brindisi, various dates (via Europeana)
 Items related to Brindisi, various dates (via Digital Public Library of America)

Brindisi
Brindisi
Brindisi